Chor Ho To Aisa is a 1978 Bollywood film directed by Ravi Tandon. The film stars Shatrughan Sinha, Reena Roy in lead roles.

Cast

Shatrughan Sinha as Sanju / Shankar 
Reena Roy as Champa
Pran as Prannath
Madan Puri as Chinaramu "Ramu" 
Bindu as Seema
Raza Murad as Birju
Rajendra Nath as Gobar Ganesh
Sulochana Latkar as Mrs. Prannath
Jagdish Raj as Police Inspector 
Vikas Anand as Anil 
Anwar Hussain as Jagannath Rana "Jaggu" 
Jankidas as Shah 
Baldev Khosa as Police Inspector 
Mac Mohan as Alexander

Plot
Pran Nath lives a poor life-style with his wife and young son, Sanju. On 12Dec, Sanju's birthday, the police raid his house, find stolen jewelry that belongs to his employer, he is arrested, tried in court, found guilty, and sentenced to three years in prison. On the way to the prison, there is an accident and all travelers are killed. His wife and Sanju re-locate, but Sanju is abducted by Chinaramu, and trained to be a criminal at a young age. Years later, Sanju has grown up, is now known as Shankar, has no knowledge of his parents' whereabouts, and is a career criminal. He comes to the rescue of a village belle named Champa and both fall in love. They find out that Champa's brother, Birju, is in jail, arrested for murder. Both know that Birju is not guilty, and swear to find out who the killer is. Before they could do anything, Shankar himself is arrested and held in a cell - and the charge is cold-blooded murder of a pregnant woman named Seema. Watch what happens when Champa finds out that Shankar may have been two-timing her, leaving the onus on her alone to get evidence to free Birju.

Soundtrack

External links
 

1978 films
Films scored by R. D. Burman
1970s Hindi-language films
Films directed by Ravi Tandon